Saint Michael Parish may refer to:
The Parish of Saint Michael, Barbados
Saint Michaels Parish, Denmark

Parish name disambiguation pages